Stock Spirits Group, which has its origins in a company founded in 1884 in Trieste, Italy, is among the largest alcohol beverage companies in Europe. As of November 2022 Stock Spirits Group was owned by the private equity business, CVC Advisors.

History
The company's key brands, Polmos Lublin and Wódka Żołądkowa Gorzka were established in Poland in 1906 and 1950 respectively. Oaktree Capital Management acquired Polmos Lublin in 2006 and merged it with Eckes & Stock, a business founded in the Czech Republic as Camis & Stock by Lionello Stock in Trieste in 1884, to create Stock Spirits Group in 2008. The company was the subject of an initial public offering in October 2013.

On 12 August 2021, Stock Spirits' board of directors accepted a £767 million takeover bid by private equity firm CVC Advisers, whereby shareholders would receive 377p per share. The deal was completed in November 2021.

Operations
The company has a portfolio of more than 70 brands, present in over 50 countries worldwide including the US and Canada.

References

Food and drink companies of England
Food and drink companies established in 1884
1884 establishments in England
Companies listed on the London Stock Exchange